Joseph Mullings (born 1 April 1874, date of death unknown) was a Jamaican cricketer. He played in six first-class matches for the Jamaican cricket team from 1894 to 1897.

See also
 List of Jamaican representative cricketers

References

External links
 

1874 births
Year of death missing
Jamaican cricketers
Jamaica cricketers
People from Saint Elizabeth Parish